Leitkultur is a German concept, which can be translated as 'guiding culture' or 'leading culture', less literally as 'common culture', 'core culture' or 'basic culture'. The term was first introduced in 1998 by the German-Arab sociologist Bassam Tibi 
and from 2000 onward the term figured prominently in the national political debate in Germany about national identity and immigration.

Bassam Tibi's definition

Bassam Tibi first suggested a 'Leitkultur' in his 1998 book Europa ohne Identität ('Europe without identity'). He defined it in terms of what are commonly called western values, and spoke of a European rather than a German 'Leitkultur'. "The values needed for a core culture are those of modernity: democracy, secularism, the Enlightenment, human rights and civil society." (B. Tibi, Europa ohne Identität, p. 154). These core values are similar to those of the 'liberal-democratic basic order' (Freiheitlich-demokratische Grundordnung) which is considered the foundational value of the post-war West Germany, and the unified German state after the German reunification of 1990. Tibi advocated cultural pluralism based on value consensus, rather than monoculturalism. However, he also opposed value-blind multiculturalism, and the development of parallel societies where immigrant minorities live and work, isolated from western society around them. Tibi advocated a structured immigration policy, and opposed illegal immigration into Germany.

Nationwide debate in Germany 

Theo Sommer, then publisher of Die Zeit, was one of the first to use the term German core culture, as part of a debate about the assimilation of immigrants in Germany, and national core values: "Integration necessarily implies a far-reaching assimilation onto the German guiding culture and its core values" („Der Kopf zählt, nicht das Tuch“, Zeit 30/1998).

However, the term only became a national political issue in October 2000. Friedrich Merz, then leader of the Christian-Democratic CDU in the Bundestag, wrote an article for Die Welt, rejecting multiculturalism, and advocated controls on immigration and compulsory assimilation in a German core culture. Merz, after being reminded of the earlier article by Theo Sommer, referred to Sommer as the inspiration for this policy. Sommer, in turn, claimed he was only advocating integration of immigrants, and distanced himself from the call for restriction of immigration ("Einwanderung ja, Ghettos nein - Warum Friedrich Merz sich zu Unrecht auf mich beruft", Zeit 47/2000). Merz, supported by the Brandenburg interior minister Jörg Schönbohm (CDU), proposed an annual immigration limit of 200 000, about 0.25% of the German population. Anything more, according to Merz, would exceed the absorptive capacity of German society. Immigrants had a duty, according to Merz, to adopt the basic cultural values of Germany.

Bassam Tibi now protested that politicians had appropriated his proposal for their own purposes, and pronounced the entire debate a 'failure'. Most of the reactions to Merz's proposals were negative, and the debate split along party lines, with the government coalition (social-democratic SPD and the Green Party) rejecting a German Leitkultur. Cem Özdemir (then Bundestag member, Green Party) and others defended 'integration' as against 'assimilation' of immigrants. Forcing immigrants to assimilate at any price would in any case, according to Özdemir, deny the reality that Germany was a multicultural society. Some reactions in media outside Germany likened the Leitkultur proposals to the enforced Germanisation in territories occupied by Nazi Germany, where the population was usually forbidden to speak local languages.

In 2005, the new presiding chairman of the Bundestag, Norbert Lammert (CDU), proposed a re-opening of the debate on a Leitkultur. The proposal, he said in an interview in Die Zeit, has been summarily dismissed without argument; "The noticeable thing about the very short national debate is that the Leitkultur concept was widely rejected, as a negative reflex, but that there was a wide recognition of the problems underlying the debate" ("Das Parlament hat kein Diskussionsmonopol", Zeit 43/2005). There was no noticeable reaction to his suggestion at first: Lammert then proposed to move the discussion to a European level, to establish a European core identity. In an article in Die Welt, he wrote: "If Europe wishes to preserve the multiplicity of nation identities, and yet establish a collective identity, it must develop a political core ideal, a set of foundational values and convictions. Such a European core ideal must necessarily be based on the common cultural roots of Europe, on its shared history, and on shared religious tradition," (Die Welt, 13 December 2005).

In early 2006, the Jyllands-Posten Muhammad cartoons controversy led to violent protests in Islamic countries, against depictions of Muhammad in a Danish newspaper. Lammert now restated his demand for a re-opening of the Leitkultur debate. The cartoon protests, he said, show that German society must reach a consensus on its "foundational values and a minimal standard of value orientation". The 'constitutional patriotism' (proposed by the philosopher Jürgen Habermas) would not suffice, since all constitutions are based on non-random cultural assumptions. Fundamental rights, such as freedom of the press and freedom of expression, must be fully supported by a social consensus. Given the background of a multicultural society in Germany, according to Lammert, rights must be linked to certain cultural values, and a nationwide debate on this issue was necessary, to re-establish such a link. The idea of multiculturalism was "perhaps originally well-intentioned", but had reached the end of its useful life. Multiculturalism could not be allowed to create a society where all values were equal – and therefore in practice had no values. In conflicts of values, society had to decide which values were valid, and which were not. Lammert insisted that he had never spoken of a German Leitkultur. The essential elements of the German culture were not specifically German, he said, and it would be better to speak of a European Leitkultur. (Deutschlandfunk interview with Lammert, reported in the Frankfurter Allgemeine Zeitung of 8 February 2006).

Jörg Schönbohm also remains a vigorous advocate of a German core culture: in 2006 he suggested changing the name of the Berlin radio station radiomultikulti into 'Radio Schwarz-Rot-Gold' (black-red-gold, the colours of the flag of Germany).

Immigrant tests

The concept of Leitkultur figured prominently in the national debate about a test for immigrants to Germany. These tests are known in English as 'citizenship tests', see Life in the United Kingdom test, but they often apply to all immigrants, not just those seeking naturalisation. In Germany, the federal parliament (Bundestag) ultimately decided against a national immigrant test, but the 16 states can set their own tests, which can be based on an officially defined German culture and values.

See also
 Cultural selection theory
 Ethnocentrism
 Immigration
 Jürgen Habermas
 Modernity
 Multiculturalism
 Nation-state
 Values

References

Further reading
 Bassam Tibi, Europa ohne Identität, Die Krise der multikulturellen Gesellschaft, 1998.
 Bassam Tibi, Multikultureller Werte-Relativismus und Werte-Verlust, In: Aus Politik und Zeitgeschehen (Das Parlament), B 52–53/96, p. 27–36
 Bassam Tibi, Leitkultur als Wertekonsens - Bilanz einer missglückten deutschen Debatte, In: Aus Politik und Zeitgeschehen (Das Parlament), B 1–2/2001, p. 23–26
 Theo Sommer, Der Kopf zählt, nicht das Tuch - Ausländer in Deutschland: Integration kann keine Einbahnstraße sein, ZEIT 30/1998
 Theo Sommer, Einwanderung ja, Ghettos nein - Warum Friedrich Merz sich zu Unrecht auf mich beruft, ZEIT 47/2000
 Interview: »Das Parlament hat kein Diskussionsmonopol« Der neue Bundestagspräsident Norbert Lammert über die Konkurrenz durch Talkshows und den Ansehensverlust der Politik, ZEIT 43/2005
 Auch die EU braucht ein ideelles Fundament, Gastkommentar: Leitkultur von Norbert Lammert, Die Welt, December 13, 2005
 Interview mit Norbert Lammert: "Lammert plädiert für neue Leitkultur-Debatte. Bundestagspräsident fordert breite öffentliche Diskussion", Deutschlandfunk (Kultur heute), 20.10.2005.
 Lammerts Wiedervorlage, FAZ., February 8, 2006.
 Pautz, Hartwig: Die deutsche Leitkultur. Eine Identitätsdebatte: Neue Rechte, Neorassismus und Normalisierungsbemühungen. Stuttgart 2005
 
 Jörg Schönbohm. "Multikulti ist am Ende". 7 July 2006. NZ Netzeitung.

External links
Andrea Mrozek. "Heavy on the Leitkultur". December 2000. Central Europe Review.
Hans Ulrich Gumbrecht.  "Taking the immigrant test". signandsight.
Charles Hawley. "What's a German? The Search for Identity Continues". Der Spiegel International.
 Deutsche Welle: "German issues in a nutshell: 'Leitkultur' - acceptance vs. assimilation"

1990s neologisms
German nationalism
German words and phrases
Multiculturalism in Europe
Cultural assimilation
German culture